Procerithiidae is a taxonomic family of sea snails, marine gastropod molluscs in the clade Sorbeoconcha.

Argyropeza is the only extant genus in the Procerithiidae.

Taxonomy 
The following three subfamilies are recognized in the taxonomy of Bouchet & Rocroi (2005):
 † Procerithiinae Cossmann, 1906
 † Paracerithiinae Cossmann, 1906
 Cryptaulacinae Gründel, 1976 - include Argyropeza

2006 taxonomy 
Bandel (2006)  described a new subfamily, Argyropezinae.

 Argyropezinae Bandel, 2006
 † Procerithiinae Cossmann, 1906 - include Cryptaulax
 † Paracerithiinae Cossmann, 1906

Bandel (2006) expressed doubts about the validity of Cryptaulacinae, because Cryptaulax and Procerithium may be based on the same species.

Genera 
Genera within the family v include:

Procerithiinae
 † Procerithium Cossmann, 1902 - type genus
 † Cryptaulax Tate, 1869 - type genus of the subfamily Cryptaulacinae, when considered valid.
 Cryptaulax sakarahensis Bandel, 2006

Paracerithiinae
 † Paracerithium Cossmann, 1902 - type genus of the subfamily Paracerithiinae

Argyropezinae
 Argyropeza Mellvill & Standen, 1901

References